Louise Lundsgaard Winter Kristiansen (born 24 September 1987) is a Danish international footballer who plays as a forward. She was a member of the Denmark national team. She was part of the team at the 2016 Algarve Cup. On club level she plays for Brøndby IF in Denmark.

She made her debut on the Danish national team in October 2006, against the USA at a tournament in Busan, South Korea.

She has previously appeared for Ballerup-Skovlunde Fodbold and IK Skovbakken.

Merits

Club 

 Brøndby IF

The Elite Division

 Gold: 2018-19
 Gold: 2016-17
 Gold: 2014-15
 Silver: 2017-18
 Silver: 2015-16

Sydbank Kvindepokalen

 Gold: 2018
 Gold: 2017
 Gold: 2015
 Silver: 2019
 Silver: 2016

References

External links

 
 Denmark player profile

1987 births
Living people
Danish women's footballers
Place of birth missing (living people)
Women's association football forwards
Ballerup-Skovlunde Fodbold (women) players
People from Kalundborg
Sportspeople from Region Zealand
Denmark women's international footballers